The Hundred of Killanoola is a hundred in the County of Robe in the Limestone Coast region of South Australia.

The hundred is part of the Coonawarra wine-growing area.

References

Limestone Coast
Killanoola